The depiction of disability in the media plays a major role in molding the public perception of disability. Perceptions portrayed in the media directly influence the way people with disabilities are treated in current society. "[Media platforms] have been cited as a key site for the reinforcement of negative images and ideas in regard to people with disabilities."

As a direct response, there have been increasing examples worldwide of people with disabilities pursuing their own media projects, such as creating film series centered on disability issues, radio programs and podcasts designed around and marketed towards those with disabilities, and so on.

Common depictions
The media generally depicts people with disabilities according to common stereotypes such as pity and heroism.
Disability advocates often call this type of societal situation the "pity/heroism trap" or "pity/heroism dichotomy" and call instead for its supporters to "Piss On Pity" and push forward with inclusion instead.

When reports are about the "plight of the disabled" they rely on the pity or medical model of disability. Telethons are an example of this, such as the Jerry Lewis MDA Telethon which has been heavily criticised and sometimes even physically protested by disability rights advocates.

Negative day-to-day reporting may occur chiefly by depicting a given person or people with a disability as a burden or drain on society.

The "super-crip" model, in which subjects are portrayed as heroically overcoming their conditions, is also often used when reporting on people with disabilities.

The social model tends to be used for reporting on the activities of disability rights activists if the report is positive.

The term "inspiration porn" was coined in 2012 by disability rights activist Stella Young in an editorial in Australian Broadcasting Corporation's webzine Ramp Up. The term describes when people with disabilities are called inspirational solely or in part on the basis of their disability.

Researchers note that information is prioritized for people with disabilities, with communication as a hard  distinct second and entertainment is framed as a luxury

Stereotypes and Tropes

Stereotypical depictions of disability that originate in the arts, film, literature, television, and other mass media fiction works, are frequently normalized through repetition to the general audience. Once such a stereotype is absorbed and accepted by the mainstream public, it continues to be repeated in the media, in many slightly varied forms, but staying close to the stereotype. Many media stereotypes about disability have been identified. They are sometimes referred to as "tropes", meaning a recurring image or representation in the mainstream culture that is widely recognizable. Tropes repeated in works of fiction have an influence on how society at large perceives people with disabilities. Other forms of media, in turn, then portray people with disabilities in ways that conform with tropes and repeat them.

Some of these disability tropes that have been identified in popular culture include:
 "Little People are Surreal"
Examples of this include the character Tattoo on the television series Fantasy Island; a recurring use of a dwarf as a motif in American film director David Lynch's works, such as Mulholland Drive; and a dwarf actor who appears as a prominent cast extra in the film The Eyes of Laura Mars.
 "Single Episode Disability"
This is where a regular character on a television series obtains a temporary disability, learns a moral lesson, and makes a rapid, full recovery. Examples include an episode of M*A*S*H where Hawkeye is temporarily blinded, and an episode of Law and Order: SVU where Detective Stabler is temporarily blind.
 "Disability Superpower"
This is where fate removes one ability, it enhances another, so that a disabled character has one superpower. This has resulted in the creation of several subtypes of this disability trope, such as Blind Seer, Blind Weapon Master, Genius Cripple and Super Wheel Chair.

Sometimes, characters that are given a disability are only seen as their disability. Through the medical model, their disability is explained and narrated in a WebMD style. This disability stereotype or myth as Jay Dolmage describes it can be known as the "Disability as Pathology" myth. It is a common stereotype that proves to be harmful because it feeds society the idea that disabled people are their disability first before a person.

Other disability stereotypes that have been identified in popular culture include:
 The object of pity
With this, disability is commonly associated with an illness or disease.
See inspiration porn
 Sinister or evil

Characters who are portrayed as having physical disabilities are cast as the anti-hero, such as in the films Ant-Man and the Wasp (the character Ghost) and Split.
 Eternal innocence
Paired with people with intellectual disabilities, such as in the films Forrest Gump, I Am Sam and Rain Man.
 The victim of violence
 Asexual, undesirable, or incapable of sexual or romantic interactions:
Examples include adolescent coming-of-age storylines such as Artie Abrams on Glee, and "teen sick-lit" such as The Fault in our Stars.

 Disability con:
The "disability con" or "disability faker" is not disabled but pretends to have a disability for profit or personal gain. Examples include the character Verbal Kint in the film The Usual Suspects, who fakes a limp in order to take advantage of others, and is shown at the end walking out of the police station scot-free, and without the limp.

While there are con artists who fake a disability such as Belle Gibson, they are rare, while people with genuine disabilities are relatively common. Media, and especially current affairs reporting, that focuses on the few fraudulent fake-disabled people while ignoring or systematically under-representing the many genuinely disabled people creates a misperception of disabled people which encourages negative stereotyping. This is especially problematic for people with hidden disabilities, who may be disbelieved and abused by members of the public for "faking it," as they believe that disability fakers are more common than genuine disabilities. One example is wheelchair users not being able to walk. 
 
The existence of disability tropes in mass media is related to other stereotypes, or tropes, that have developed when other marginalized groups in society are depicted, such as the Magical Negro trope identified, and criticized, by film director Spike Lee. The mocking names often given to these tropes when they are identified indicates a rejection of the harmful stereotypes that they propagate.

Stereotypes may endure in a culture for several reasons: they are constantly reinforced in the culture, which mass media does easily and effectively; they reflect a common human need to organize people and categorize them; they reinforce discrimination that allows one group of society to exploit and marginalize another group. Several studies of mass media in Britain and the United States have identified common stereotypes, such as "noble warrior", "charity cripple", "curio", "freak", and "Pollyanna", where the researchers identified a position of "disapproval", on the part of the media, of some aspect of the disability. It has been shown that media portrayals of disability became more normalizing and accepting in the years immediately after World War II, when returning veterans with war-related disabilities were being reintegrated into society. A backlash of intolerance towards disability followed during the mid-20th century, with some researchers speculating that this may have been related to society's reaction against any identifiable "difference" as a result of Cold War tensions. Depictions of disability in media soon reverted to emphasizing the "freakish" nature of disability.

Broadcast media programming for disabled audiences
Broadcast media has in recent years begun to recognize the large audience of people with disabilities that it reaches. Programming dedicated to disability issues is increasing.

In 1990, the signing of the Americans with Disabilities Act (ADA) became the first news story on disability issues to become a lead story on cable news broadcaster CNN. News Director Ed Turner contacted the Washington bureau of CNN to have the signing of the ADA by President Bush broadcast live. The next day, the signing of the ADA was covered as the top headline in The New York Times, The Washington Post, and every other major U.S. newspaper. Disability rights activist Lex Frieden has stated, "That was the first time that millions of people were exposed to disability rights as the number one story". These milestones were a major change in reducing exclusion and invisibility for people with disabilities.

Ouch! by the British Broadcasting Corporation, The Largest Minority broadcast in New York City, and Dtv presented in sign language on SABC television in South Africa, are examples of programming produced for, and usually also by, people with disabilities.

Radio reading services are radio stations that broadcast readings from newspapers, magazines and books to mainly blind or partially sighted audiences.

In recent years, some mainstream publications and broadcasters have added writing and programming about disability-related topics. The Creative Diversity Network in the United Kingdom is an organization that advocates increased cultural and disability-related programming. Clare Morrow, the organization's Network Manager, states that "Disability is now at the heart of the diversity agenda for all of the UK's main television companies, thanks to their collective work".  The BBC Website includes Ouch!, a disability news and discussion blog and internet talk show program.

Publications and broadcasts by disability related organisations

Many activist and charitable organisations have websites and publish their own magazines or newsletters.

Disability in documentary film
Disability has been shown to audiences since the early days of documentary film. Educational silent films showing hospital patients with various disabling conditions were shown to medical and nursing students. Films of schizophrenia patients with symptoms of catatonia, World War I veterans with extreme posttraumatic stress disorder (PTSD) (shell-shock) symptoms, and many other such films survive today. Michael J. Dowling (1866-1921) was a prominent Minnesota politician and newspaper publisher, who was also a quadruple amputee. World War I inspired him to further the cause of veterans with disabilities. Dowling had himself filmed performing routine tasks on his own, and had the films screened for groups such as the American Medical Association in 1918. His efforts promoted the rehabilitation of physically disabled people.

Documentary films sometimes had a tone that was a reflection of the public's morbid curiosity about visible disabilities that were considered shameful and ordinarily were hidden from public view. Nazi propagandists exploited this fear and prejudice to push the public to accept their euthanasia policies, including forcible sterilization, by screening films showing people with intellectual and physical disabilities living in squalid conditions. At the same time, American President Franklin D. Roosevelt and his White House staff made a great effort to disguise his disability (Roosevelt became paraplegic after contracting polio as an adult). Roosevelt was photographed and filmed only from positions that would hide his disability from the public, for fear that he would be perceived as weak.

More recently, documentary films about disability have been widely viewed on both public and cable television programming. The Channel 5 (UK) program Extraordinary Lives, and Channel 4 program Body Shock in the United Kingdom, broadcast much documentary material about disability. Titles of some documentary programming includes: "The Boy Who Sees Without Eyes — the 14-year-old American boy who navigates by sound; The Twin Within the Twin — the 34-year-old Bengali who carries his foetal twin within his abdomen; and The Twins Who Share a Body — Abby and Brittany Hensel, the world's only known dicephalus twins, ie. two heads with one body".  Some of the documentaries, perceived to be in the "shock doc" (shock documentary) genre, have been denounced by critics with disabilities. Although the documentary programming contains educational and scientific information, the sensationalized, overt emotional appeal of the "tabloid tone" of the programming has raised objections. Laurence Clark has written in the BBC Website's disability blog Ouch!:

Documentary photography

The first photographer to become widely known for depicting the visibly disabled was Diane Arbus, active in the 1950s and 1960s. Her photographs, which are in fact art photographs, have been, and remain, highly controversial.

American documentary photographers Tom Olin and Harvey Finkle, known for documenting the disability rights movement since the 1980s, have exhibited at many venues including the National Constitution Center Museum.

Responses
Members of the public with disabilities have criticized media depictions of disability on the grounds that stereotypes are commonly repeated. Media coverage that is "negative", "unrealistic", or displays a preference for the "pitiful" and "sensationalistic" over the "everyday and human side of disability" are identified at the root of the dissatisfaction. Journalist Leye Jeannette Chrzanowski, who uses a wheelchair, has written:

Various organisations and programmes have been established to try to positively influence the frequency and quality of reporting on disability issues. By 2000, it was estimated that in the United States, there were between 3000 and 3500 newsletters, 200 magazines, and 50 to 60 newspapers regularly published that focussed on disability issues.

See also

 Disability in the arts
 Autistic art
 National Center on Disability and Journalism

References

Disability mass media
Works about discrimination
Ableism